Kimberly Walker (died February 14, 2013) was an American in the US Army with the rank of corporal who served in the Iraq war. 

Walker was strangled to death by her boyfriend, Sergeant Montrell Lamar Anderson Mayo, on February 14, 2013, in a Colorado Springs, Colorado hotel room. Mayo was convicted of first-degree murder by a military jury and sentenced to life without parole, demotion to private and dishonorable discharge.

References

2013 deaths